Crazyracing KartRider is an online multiplayer racing game developed by Nexon. It is part of the Crazy Arcade franchise. It earns revenue by selling virtual items within the in-game shop, including different types of vehicles and spraypaints. KartRider features fictitious fantasy vehicles and branded game models based on real-life cars, developed in collaboration with companies such as BMW Korea.

Gameplay

The game offers a variety of game modes, primarily based around item races using power-ups (comparable to Mario Kart). Speed racing which requires the player to drift to gain boost items.

Development

The initial South Korean service started on June 1, 2004. Localized releases launched in Mainland China as PopKart on March 18, 2006, and Taiwan on January 4, 2007.

A closed beta for an English release of KartRider began in America on May 1, 2007, and ended on May 31, 2007. The open beta began on October 2, 2007, and ended on March 19, 2008. All references to the game were subsequently removed from Nexon America's website without further statement.

Later localizations, which are no longer serviced, were released in Thailand, Vietnam (as BoomSpeed), Russia, Indonesia, and Japan.

The Taiwan release shut down on January 31, 2023. The South Korean service ends on March 31, 2023, despite noticeable backlash of players. This leaves the Chinese localization the only in operation.

Other versions

On March 11, 2011, Nexon America released a mobile version of KartRider for the Apple App Store under the name KartRider Rush. This version closed later on as well. A KartRider client released for Facebook called KartRider Dash has been shut down as of April 15, 2014.

On May 12, 2020, KartRider Rush+ was released on Google Play and the iOS App Store, the latter already having provided a Chinese version the year before in 2019.

Reception
By 2007, about 25% of South Koreans had played the game at least once. , the game has reached a total of over  registered users worldwide on the PC platform, including over half of the Korean population and over 45% of the Taiwanese population.

The mobile version KartRider Rush+ surpassed 10 million downloads globally after its first two weeks of release. It has also topped the Google Play ranking of South Korea.

By 2020, the franchise had grossed over  worldwide in lifetime revenue. , it has grossed over  worldwide.

KartRider: Drift

On November 14, 2019, Nexon announced an updated cross-platform version under the name KartRider: Drift at Microsoft's X019.

Two closed beta tests ran from December 6, 2019 to December 9, 2019 and June 4, 2020 to June 10, 2020 for the Windows and Xbox One platforms. The third closed beta test was held between December 9, 2021 and December 15, 2021, adding PlayStation 4 support. The open beta test (referred to as "Global Racing Test") began on September 1, 2022 and ended on September 6, 2022, adding Android and iOS support.

The game was released on January 11, 2023 on Windows, Android, and iOS. Support for PlayStation 4 and Xbox One was added on March 8, 2023.

References

External links 
 
 KartRider: Drift website

2004 video games
Multiplayer online games
Kart racing video games
Racing video games
Video games developed in South Korea
Nexon games
Windows games
Windows-only games